Sergey M. Bezrukov is a Russian born biophysicist notable for his work on ion channels and stochastic resonance.

Education

He received his MS in Electronics and Theoretical Physics from
Saint Petersburg Polytechnical University, 1973; and he obtained his PhD under 
Giliary Moiseevich Drabkin in Physics and Mathematics from 
Moscow State University, Russia, 1981.

Career
During 1981-87, he was a research scientist, Leningrad Nuclear Physics Institute, Laboratory of Condensed Matter Physics; in 1987-90 a Senior Research Scientist, Leningrad Nuclear Physics Institute, Laboratory of Condensed Matter Physics; in 1990-92 he was a Visiting Research Associate, University of Maryland, College Park and Special Volunteer, National Institutes of Health, LBM, NIDDK; in 1992-98 he was visiting scientist, National Institutes of Health, LSB, DCRT and LPSB, NICHD; in 1998-02 he was an Investigator, Head of Unit, National Institutes of Health, LPSB, NICHD. He took up his present position in 2002, as Section Chief in the Laboratory of Physical and Structural Biology, National Institutes of Health, Bethesda, Maryland.

Honors
Bezrukov was elected Member of Executive Council of the Division of Biological Physics of the American Physical Society in 2002.

See also
 Lipid membranes
 Noise-based logic
 SEPTIC bacterium detection/identification method
 Quantum Aspects of Life (book)
 Stochastic Resonance (book)

External links
 
 Bezrukov's math genealogy
 Bezrukov's homepage
 Bezrukov at Scientific Commons

Year of birth missing (living people)
Living people
Moscow State University alumni
Russian emigrants to the United States
Russian physicists
Soviet physicists
20th-century American physicists
American nuclear physicists
Russian nuclear physicists
Soviet nuclear physicists
Probability theorists
Fellows of the American Physical Society